Bryant Creek State Park is one of three new Missouri state parks announced in 2016. The park is closed and awaiting development.

The park will include about two miles of the meandering channel of Bryant Creek and the dolomite and sandstone bluffs along the river. The park includes oak and pine forested land adjacent to the river.  The park will provide trails for hiking and areas for camping, picnicking and nature study.

References

External links
 Bryant Creek State Park Missouri Department of Natural Resources
 Bryant Creek State Park Information Meeting Missouri Department of Natural Resources

State parks of Missouri
Protected areas of Douglas County, Missouri
Protected areas established in 2016
2016 establishments in Missouri